Ubong Essien  (born 17 December 2001) is a Nigerian footballer who plays as a midfielder for Nigeria Professional Football League club Akwa United.

Club career

Essien began his professional career in 2018, when he joined Akwa United from Kano-based Welcome Time Soccer Academy. He signed for the Uyo club on 1 January 2018, but was unveiled on 7 January 2018. Essien made his Nigeria Professional Football League debut for the club in the 2–1 win over Enyimba on 30 May 2018.

References

Living people
2001 births
Association football midfielders
People from Akwa Ibom State 
Sportspeople from Akwa Ibom State
Nigerian footballers